A Buchan trap (alternative names: Bristol interceptor,   interceptor trap and disconnecting trap) is a device made from fireclay located in a domestic sewer pipe to prevent odours entering the pipe from the public sewer and thus the property served by the drain. The trap uses a water seal to prevent air from the public sewer entering the property. In the days before individual plumbing fittings were separately trapped, the smell from the public sewer could permeate the house. Waste flows from the house through a U-bend in the trap. This means that there is always water in the pipe preventing the passage of anything from the other direction. The device is a large clay U-bend with an air-inlet/access point on the 'house' side. It is located below the ground level, but can be accessed through the air-inlet and sometimes a rodding hole.

Blockage risk
The Buchan trap will collect solids, sludge and waste that is not in suspension. In recent times, non-paper based wipes have posed a particular problem, according to most Water Authorities. The end result of these adverse conditions is a partial or complete blockage. The sewage/rainwater then backs up the pipe and exits from the lowest connected appliance (sink, bath, dish washer, washing machine, etc.). This can be a significant problem in multi-level dwellings (e.g. tenements) where those at the lowest level will receive all the waste waters from those above. They should be checked, and cleaned if required, on a recurring basis, such as annually.

History
The Buchan trap was devised in the 19th century to stop the flow of sewer gases also known as miasmas.  It was believed that the disease cholera was an airborne infection, not waterborne. The Buchan trap is normally found in the bottom  of manholes or drop-shafts. It normally denotes  the end point of the domestic property's sewer  before it joins the main public sewer.

Plumbing